Washington County is a county located in the U.S. state of Vermont. Named after George Washington, its county seat is the city of Montpelier (the least populous state capital in the United States) and the most populous municipality is the city of Barre. As of the 2020 census, the population was 59,807, making it the third-most populous county in Vermont, but the third-least populous capital county in the United States after Hughes County, South Dakota and Franklin County, Kentucky. Washington County comprises the Barre, Vermont micropolitan statistical area. In 2010, the center of population of Vermont was located in Washington County, in the town of Warren.

History
Washington County is one of several Vermont counties created from land ceded by the state of New York on January 15, 1777, when Vermont declared itself to be a distinct state from New York. The land originally was contested by Massachusetts, New Hampshire, and New Netherland, but it remained undelineated until July 20, 1764, when King George III established the boundary between New Hampshire and New York along the west bank of the Connecticut River, north of Massachusetts and south of the parallel of 45 degrees north latitude. New York assigned the land gained to Albany County. On March 12, 1772, Albany County was partitioned to create Charlotte County, and this situation remained until Vermont's independence from New York and Britain.

Washington County was originally established as Jefferson County in 1810 from parts of Caledonia County, Chittenden County, and Orange County and organized the following year.

In 1814 it was renamed to Washington County. The name change occurred after the Federalists took control of the Vermont Legislature from the Jeffersonians. Vermont which conducted significant trade with British Canada had suffered particularly by passage of the Embargo Act of 1807 during the Jefferson administration.

Geography

Major highways
  Interstate 89

Adjacent counties
 Lamoille County – north
 Caledonia County – northeast
 Orange County – southeast
 Addison County – southwest
 Chittenden County – northwest

National protected area
 Green Mountain National Forest (part)

Demographics

2010 census
As of the 2010 United States Census, there were 59,534 people, 25,027 households, and 15,410 families residing in the county.

Of the 25,027 households, 28.2% had children under the age of 18 living with them, 47.1% were married couples living together, 10.0% had a female householder with no husband present, 38.4% were non-families, and 29.7% of all households were made up of individuals. The average household size was 2.28 and the average family size was 2.81. The median age was 42.3 years.

The median income for a household in the county was $55,313 and the median income for a family was $66,968. Males had a median income of $45,579 versus $38,052 for females. The per capita income for the county was $28,337. About 5.9% of families and 10.5% of the population were below the poverty line, including 13.8% of those under age 18 and 7.5% of those age 65 or over.

Elections
In 1828, Washington County was won by National Republican Party candidate John Quincy Adams.

In 1832, the county was won by Democratic Party incumbent president Andrew Jackson. Democratic Martin Van Buren was also able to win the county in 1836.

In 1840, the county was won by Whig Party candidate William Henry Harrison.

In 1844, the county was won by Democratic candidate James K. Polk. Democratic candidate Lewis Cass was also able to win the county in 1848.

In 1852, Whig Party candidate Winfield Scott won the county.

From John C. Frémont in 1856 to Richard Nixon in 1960, the Republican Party would have a 104-year winning streak within Washington County.

In 1964, the county was won by Democratic Party incumbent President Lyndon B. Johnson.

Following the Democrats victory in 1964, the county went back to voting for Republican candidates for another 20 year winning streak starting with Richard Nixon in 1968 and ending with George H. W. Bush in 1988, who became the last Republican presidential candidate to win the county.

In 1992, the county was won by Bill Clinton and has been won by Democratic candidates ever since.

|}

Communities

Cities
 Barre
 Montpelier (shire town)

Towns

 Barre (Town)
 Berlin
 Cabot
 Calais
 Duxbury
 East Montpelier
 Fayston
 Marshfield
 Middlesex
 Moretown
 Northfield
 Plainfield
 Roxbury
 Waitsfield
 Warren
 Waterbury
 Woodbury
 Worcester

Village
 Marshfield

Census-designated places

 Cabot
 East Barre
 East Montpelier
 Graniteville
 Northfield
 Plainfield
 South Barre
 Waitsfield
 Waterbury
 Waterbury Center
 Websterville
 Worcester

Other unincorporated communities
 Adamant
 East Calais
 East Montpelier Center
 East Roxbury
 Irasville
 North Montpelier
 Putnamville
 Riverton
 South Northfield
 South Woodbury

Education
School districts include:
 Barre Supervisory Union
 Caledonia Central Supervisory Union
 Central Vermont Supervisory Union
 Harwood Unified School District
 Montpelier-Roxbury Supervisory Union
 Orleans Southwest Supervisory Union
 Washington Central Supervisory Union

See also
 List of counties in Vermont
 List of towns in Vermont
 National Register of Historic Places listings in Washington County, Vermont

References

External links
 National Register of Historic Places listing for Washington Co., Vermont
 Life in Washington County Documentary produced by Vermont Public Television

 
1811 establishments in Vermont
Populated places established in 1811